Leovegildo Lins da Gama Júnior (born 29 June 1954), also known as Léo Júnior or simply Júnior, is a Brazilian football pundit and retired footballer who played as a left back or midfielder. 

He was nicknamed "capacete" ("helmet", in Portuguese) because of his afro hairstyle.

He was named by Pelé as one of the top 125 greatest living footballers in March 2004. Junior now works as a television pundit for Rede Globo.

Club career

Léo Júnior played for Flamengo during the 1970s, 1980s and early 1990s, winning four Brazilian Championships (1980, 1982, 1983, 1992), the 1981 Copa Libertadores and 1981 Intercontinental Cup. With 857 matches, he is the player with most appearances for Flamengo.

On 12 June 1984 he was bought by Torino, for a fee of two million dollars. Léo Júnior asked and obtained a guarantee to play as a midfielder rather than a full-back, because he considered the former role less stressful, so to extend the life of his career. Although he was now thirty years old, after some initial difficulties, he succeeded in integrating in the formation coached by Luigi Radice, becoming the leader of the midfield. During his first year in Italy was the victim of two incidents of racism: in Milan he was repeatedly insulted and spat upon as he left the stadium with his mother and father and in Turin, on the occasion of the derby, Juventus fans exhibited offensive banners on the colour of his skin. The Torino supporters responded promptly with another banner: "Better negro than a Juventus fan". At the end of the season, finished second behind Verona, he was awarded Serie A's player of the year.

During his time with "Toro" he was also given the affectionate nickname of "papà Júnior", due to his elder appearance. He remained in Turin until 1987, when he had a fallout with the manager Radice. The coach believed the performance of the Brazilian lower than that of the first season, while Léo Júnior was particularly annoyed for being substituted during a UEFA Cup tie against HNK Hajduk Split, which culminated with the elimination of the team.

He also played for Italian club Pescara between 1987 and 1989.

International career
Léo Júnior competed in the men's tournament at the 1976 Summer Olympics.

He went on to record 74 appearances for the Brazil national team, between May 1979 and December 1992, scoring six goals. He appeared in both the 1982 and 1986 World Cup.

He also took part in many Beach Soccer World Championships as part of the Brazil national team, winning awards for top scorer and best player. Overall Léo Júnior played for Brazil beach soccer between 1993 and 2001, notching up 201 goals during those years, including 71 goals at the World Championships. He stopped playing to pursue the development of the sport. In 2019, he was crowned "Best Legend" at the 2019 Beach Soccer Stars awards and the magazine France Football placed Júnior fifth in an article named "10 Legends of Beach Soccer".

Managerial career
Léo Júnior coached Flamengo from 1993 to 1994, and in 1997. He coached Corinthians from 1 October 2003 to 10 October 2003.

Style of play
Léo Júnior was known for his technique and teamwork as well as his versatility, playing at left back and on the left side of midfield for Brazil due to his two footedness (despite being naturally right footed) whilst often playing as a central midfielder or deep-lying playmaker at club level; he was also capable of playing on the right flank, and initially started out as an attacking right-back. He was as capable of "orchestrating attacking moves as fulfilling his defensive remit." In addition to his playmaking skills, he was highly regarded for his elegance, leadership, and tactical intelligence, as well as his ability to get forward, provide precise crosses for his teammates, or strike on goal. Moreover, he was also an accurate free kick and penalty taker.

Career statistics

Club

Honours

Football
Flamengo
Intercontinental Cup: 1981
Libertadores Cup: 1981
Campeonato Brasileiro Série A: 1980, 1982, 1983, 1992
Brazil Cup 1990

Torino
 Mitropa Cup: 1991
 Serie A runner-up: 1984–85

Brazil
FIFA World Cup: round 2 (fifth place) 1982; quarter-finals (fifth place) 1986
Copa América runner-up: 1983

Individual
 Bola de Prata Brazilian Championship All-Star Team: 1980, 1983, 1984, 1991, 1992
 Bronze ball South American Player of the Year: 1981
 FIFA World Cup All-Star Team: 1982
 FIFA XI: 1982 
 Serie A player of the year: 1985
 Bola de Ouro Brazilian Footballer of the Year: 1992
 South American Team of the Year: 1992
 FIFA 100: 2004
 Most appearances in Flamengo's History – 857 apps

Beach soccer
Brazil
 Beach Soccer World Championship: 1995, 1996, 1997, 1998, 1999, 2000
 Copa América: 1994, 1995, 1996, 1997, 1998, 1999

Individual
 Beach Soccer World Championship top scorer: 1997 – 11 goals, 1998 – 14 goals, 1999 – 10 goals, 2000 – 13 goals
 Beach Soccer World Championship Best Player: 1995, 1997, 1998, 2000
 Beach Soccer Stars Legend Award: 2019

References

External links

 
 

1954 births
Living people
FIFA 100
Brazilian footballers
Torino F.C. players
Delfino Pescara 1936 players
Campeonato Brasileiro Série A players
Serie A players
Brazilian expatriate footballers
Expatriate footballers in Italy
Brazilian expatriate sportspeople in Italy
CR Flamengo footballers
Copa Libertadores-winning players
CR Flamengo managers
Olympic footballers of Brazil
Footballers at the 1976 Summer Olympics
1982 FIFA World Cup players
1983 Copa América players
1986 FIFA World Cup players
Brazilian football managers
Brazil international footballers
Sport Club Corinthians Paulista managers
Brazilian beach soccer players
Association football defenders
Campeonato Brasileiro Série A managers